Intresseklubben antecknar or intresseklubben noterar (English: The interest club makes a note) is a Swedish idiom and sarcastic expression to demonstrate a disinterest in something regarded as unnecessary or something with too detailed information. Thus, the mentioned "interest club" does not actually exist. The expression was common with the ironic generation, comparable to the Anglo-American Generation X, and got its first public break-through around the 1990s.

References 

Idioms
Irony
Swedish words and phrases